Cecil Wood may refer to:
 Cecil Wood (architect) (1878–1947), New Zealand architect
 Cecil Wood (bishop) (1874–1937), fourth Anglican Bishop of Melanesia
 Cecil Wood (English cricketer) (1875–1960), English cricketer
 Cecil Wood (Australian cricketer) (1896-1990), Australian cricketer
 Cecil Wood (engineer) (1874–1965), engineer and inventor from New Zealand

See also
 Wood (surname)